Middle Island is one of the Pelsaert Group of the Houtman Abrolhos off the coast of the  Mid West region of Western Australia.

References

Pelsaert Group